This is a list of highways of the New Zealand state highway network and some touring routes. State highways are administered by Waka Kotahi, while all other roads are the responsibility of territorial authorities.

Current

North Island

South Island

Past

The following state highways have been decommissioned. After revocation these routes have reverted to their original names (e.g. Crown Range Road), are referred to by their old route number (e.g. Route 72), or have been given white shields.

Unused numbers
The following numbers have never been used:

North Island: SH 13, SH 19, SH 42, SH 55
South Island: SH 9, SH 64, SH 66, SH 68, SH 81

See also 
List of roads and highways, for notable or famous roads worldwide

References

 List
State Highways